Helen M. Burt  is a British-Canadian pharmaceutical scientist who is the Angiotech Professor of Drug Delivery at the University of British Columbia. She serves as Associate Vice President of Research and Innovation at UBC. Her research considers novel therapeutics based on nanotechnology, including drug delivery systems for the treatment of bladder cancer and coronary artery disease.

Early life and education 
Burt is from Manchester in the United Kingdom. During a high school trip to a local hospital, she was first introduced to pharmacy. Burt was an undergraduate student at the University of Bath, where she specialised in pharmacy. She moved to Canada to complete her graduate research as a doctoral student at the University of British Columbia, where she studied anisotropy and defects on dissolution of crystals.

Research and career 
Burt joined the faculty at the University of British Columbia. Her research involves the use of nanotechnology for drug delivery. She has demonstrated that systems can provide targeted relief to different parts of the body, and release specific amounts of drug and controlled rates. In particular, Burt has studied nanocrystalline cellulose, a molecular substrate that has large surfaces areas and negative surface charges. Nanocrystalline cellulose can withstand binding of high quantities of drugs, and contain hydroxyl groups that can be used for surface modification. The hydroxyl groups can be used to selective load and release treatments, including ant-infective agents in wound dressings.

Burt worked alongside Sitka Biopharma on STK-01, a polymer nanoparticle based drug-delivery system that can be used to treat bladder cancer. The drug, which delivers targeted chemotherapy (Docetaxel) to non-muscle invasive bladder cancer, entered clinical trials in 2017.

Burt co-founded the Centre for Drug Research and Development in 2004. The centre later became adMare BioInnovations, which allows biomedical scientists to translate their research into industry. In 2011, Burt was made Associate Vice President of Research and Innovation.

Awards and honours 
 2006 Natural Sciences and Engineering Research Council Synergy Award for Innovation
 2009 Canadian Society for Pharmaceutical Sciences Award of Leadership in Canadian Pharmaceutical Sciences
 2009 University of British Columbia Killam Faculty Research Award for Science
 2020 Order of Canada

Selected publications

References 

Living people
Year of birth missing (living people)
Canadian people of British descent
Academic staff of the University of British Columbia Faculty of Medicine
Scientists from Manchester
Officers of the Order of Canada
Alumni of the University of Bath
University of British Columbia alumni
Pharmaceutical scientists
British nanotechnologists
Canadian nanotechnologists